Hirisave Chowdegowda Srikantaiah (18 July 1926 - 12 March 2011) was an Indian politician with the Indian National Congress party and a Member of Parliament of 9th Lok Sabha. He was elected to Karnataka Legislative Assembly from Shravanabelagola assembly constituency in Hassan from 1972 to 1985 and from 1999 to 2004. He was a Minister in Government of Karnataka in cabinets of Devaraj Urs, Veerendra Patil and S.M Krishna holding portfolios such as Revenue, Urban Development, Forest, Minor Irrigation, Public Works and Municipal Administration.

Early life and family 
H.C Srikantaiah was born in Hirisave village of Channarayapatna taluk in Hassan district of the erstwhile Mysore State (in present-day Karnataka). He married Nagamma in 1948. They had 3 sons and 5 daughters. He was from the Vokkaliga community in Karnataka. His eldest son H. S. Chandru died on 29 December 2020 in Bangalore. He was survived by son H. C. Lalithraghav and a daughter.

Political career 
H.C Srikantaiah began his political career by winning as an independent candidate from Shravanabelagola assembly constituency in Hassan in 1972. He later joined Indian National Congress and won continuously until 1985. He was a member of Karnataka Legislative Assembly from 1972 to 1985 and from 1999 to 2004. Srikantaiah was a Minister in Karnataka for almost 20 years. In 1980 Srikantaiah had a chance to become the Chief minister but Gundu Rao was picked for the post. He was the Minister for Cooperation in Gundu Rao ministry. After spending nearly four decades in the Indian National Congress, Srikantaiah joined the BJP ahead of 2009 Parliament elections.

Key Contributions 
Computerization of Land Records (Bhoomi Scheme)

During his tenure of Revenue Minister of Karnataka (1999-2004), Government of Karnataka launched Bhoomi Scheme - Computerization of Land Records which was a revolutionary work implemented in the state which helped millions of people in the state. The Bhoomi Scheme was the brainchild of H.C Srikantaiah and with the able support of the then Honorable Chief Minister, Sri S.M Krishna, Karnataka was the first state in the Country to implement this scheme.

Abolition of Stamp Papers

The stamp paper piracy was one of the biggest scams in the recent history of the country which has caused huge losses beyond estimation to the state exchequer. The pioneering idea of abolishing the stamp papers and an alternative foolproof system was introduced by Sri. H.C Srikantaiah during his tenure of Revenue Minister. With the able support of the then Honorable Chief Minister, Sri S.M Krishna, Karnataka was the first state in the Country to abolish stamp papers. This saved crores of rupees for the state exchequer.

Death 
He died on 12 March 2011, at a private hospital in Bangalore after a prolonged illness. He was 85. He was cremated in his birthplace Hirisave village of Channarayapatna taluk in Hassan district with state honours.

References 

Government of Karnataka
Karnataka politicians
1926 births
2011 deaths
Lok Sabha members from Karnataka
Indian National Congress politicians from Karnataka
Mysore MLAs 1972–1977
Members of the Mysore Legislature
Legislative Council
Members of the state Legislative Councils of India
Karnataka Legislative Council
Karnataka MLAs 1978–1983
Karnataka MLAs 1983–1985
Karnataka MLAs 1985–1989
Karnataka MLAs 1989–1994
Karnataka MLAs 1994–1999
Karnataka MLAs 1999–2004
Karnataka MLAs 2004–2007